Gesture language or gestural language may refer to:
 
Sign language, languages that use manual communication to convey meaning
Manually coded language, representations of oral languages in a gestural-visual form
Gesture, bodily actions to communicate particular messages, with or in place of speech

See also
Nonverbal communication